Shahan Shar is a village in Taluka Faiz Ganj of Khairpur District, Sindh, Pakistan.

Populated places in Khairpur District